XMSS may refer to:

 Extended Merkle signature scheme, a type of hash-based cryptography
 Xinmin Secondary School, a secondary school in Hougang, Singapore
 Xiamen Shuangshi High School

See also
 XMS (disambiguation)
 XMMS